Union Sportive de Bitam is a Gabonese professional association football club based in Bitam, Gabon, that competes in the Gabon Championnat National D1.

Crest

Achievements
Gabon Championnat National D1: 3
 2003, 2010, 2013.

Coupe du Gabon Interclubs: 3
 1999, 2003, 2010.

Performance in CAF competitions
CAF Champions League: 3 appearances
2004 – First Round
2011 – First Round
2014 – Preliminary Round

CAF Cup Winners' Cup: 1 appearance
2000 – First Round

Current squad

Coaches
 Emmanuel Kunde (1999–00), (2000–06)
 Régis Manon (2006–12)
 Thomas Libiih (2013)
 François Omam-Biyik (2013–)

Notes

Bitam